Jackie Gallagher may refer to:

 Jackie Fairweather (1967–2014), née Gallagher, Australian female triathlete and long-distance runner
 Jackie Gallagher (footballer) (born 1958), male English footballer
 Jackie Gallagher (baseball) (1902–1984), American Major League Baseball player
 Jackie Gallagher-Smith (born 1967), American female golfer

See also
Jack Gallagher (disambiguation)
John Gallagher (disambiguation)